Vemula is a village in YSR Kadapa district of the Indian state of Andhra Pradesh. It is located in Vemula mandal of Jammalamadugu revenue division.

References 

Villages in Kadapa district